"Bittersweet Memories" is a power ballad by the Welsh heavy metal band Bullet for My Valentine. It is the third single from the band's third studio album, Fever. The music video for "Bittersweet Memories" was released on 25 November 2010.

Background
The band told Noisecreep:

Music video

The music video for "Bittersweet Memories" starts with Matt Tuck in a room with no shirt on, singing the song. He then walks through a ruined shopping mall and it flicks to Jason James boarding up the windows and looking scared. Matt still wanders the mall. The music video shows Michael Paget playing his guitar. In the music video, Michael "Moose" Thomas smashes things with a baseball bat. Then, Matt is out of the mall, on the roof and he decides to run to the edge. However, he doesn't jump and the song ends.

Track listing

Personnel
Matthew "Matt" Tuck - lead vocals, rhythm and lead guitar
Michael "Padge" Paget - lead guitar, backing vocals
Jason "Jay" James - bass guitar, backing vocals
Michael "Moose" Thomas - drums

Charts

Critical reception
"Bittersweet Memories" did not seem to be as welcomed as the other tracks off Fever; critics like BBC classified it as a song "[...] with lyrics of childish despair and forlorn desire, the weakest track here". Or PopMatters, who also disliked the song, thinks it "[...] is absolutely terrible, having more in common with My Chemical Romance than any other band". The song, however, was one of AllMusic's track picks.

References

External links
 

2010 singles
Bullet for My Valentine songs
2010 songs
Emo songs
Rock ballads
Jive Records singles
Songs written by Matthew Tuck
Songs written by Michael Paget
Songs written by Jason James (musician)
Songs written by Don Gilmore (record producer)

Music videos directed by Nigel Dick